Dr. Sameh El-Torgoman is the Chairman of the Egyptian Competition Authority (ECA). He was appointed by the Prime Ministerial Decree No.85/2011.

Dr. El-Torgoman was the Chairman of Obelisk Asset Management. He is the Co-Founder of Obelisk Group. As the Chairman, he sets the strategic growth plan and culture of the company as well as establishing the newly acquired portfolio fund firm. He was able to complete and obtain a significant market share in an already established and saturated market place. He played the key role of the management of the organization providing leadership, management, and strategic-level thinking as well as having the necessary vision to ensure that the company follows the proper procedures and having the appropriate staff and systems in place to ensure compliance, effectively grow organization, and ensure operating efficiency.

, he holds the position of the Chairman of Tamweel Mortgage Finance where he sets the necessary requirements for mortgage loans to facilitate the process of securitization. With Dr El-Torgoman’s dynamic leadership, entrepreneurial Skills and management incantations combined with his extended vision of the market dynamics, he was able to  introduce new products to the capital market which affects the development and progress of the company.

Dr. Torgoman is the former Chairman of the Cairo and Alexandria Stock Exchange.  During his eight-year tenure at CASE, Dr. Torgoman led an overhaul of the exchange to build a world class infrastructure and revitalize the Egyptian stock market. Successful initiatives  included the modernization of the trading systems of the exchange, the establishment of the new membership and listing rules, the development of the new clearing and settlement procedures, the introduction of new products in the market (such as the OTC market and Bonds market),as well as the development of the legal and compliance systems of the market.

In 2004, Dr. Torgoman was subsequently appointed Chairman of the Egyptian Mortgage Finance Authority (MFA) where he developed a strategic plan for the overall development of the mortgage market now being implemented by the MFA.

Dr. Torgoman holds a doctorate from Stanford Law School, Stanford University in 1997 and an LLM from Harvard Law School, Harvard University in 1990. Dr. El Torgoman started his career as a Prosecutor at the judicial branch.

References 

Year of birth missing (living people)
Living people
Egyptian businesspeople
Harvard Law School alumni
Stanford Law School alumni